Arkadiusz Najemski (born 12 January 1996) is a Polish professional footballer who plays as a centre-back for Motor Lublin.

Club career
He made his I liga debut for Zagłębie Sosnowiec on 6 August 2016 in a game against MKP Pogoń Siedlce.

On 10 August 2020, he joined GKS Bełchatów on a one-year contract.

References

External links
 

1996 births
Footballers from Warsaw
Living people
Polish footballers
Poland youth international footballers
Association football defenders
Legia Warsaw II players
Zagłębie Sosnowiec players
Wigry Suwałki players
GKS Bełchatów players
Motor Lublin players
I liga players
II liga players